Humanité is a 1999 film directed by Bruno Dumont. It tells the story of a withdrawn police lieutenant investigating a rape and murder of a schoolgirl in rural France, his slow enquiries interspersed with everyday scenes of his quiet life. The film is shot with little dialogue in a contemplative and symbolical style. The policeman is named after a distinguished French painter, Pharaon de Winter, who was from the town where the film is set.

Plot
In the far north of France, filmed in Bailleul, a girl of 11 has been raped and murdered as she walked to her parents' remote farm from the school bus. Called onto the case, Lieutenant Pharaon de Winter feels extreme revulsion. After having lost his partner and child in an accident, he now lives quietly with his widowed mother.

At the weekend his neighbour Domino, who is sympathetic to his deeply affected state, asks him to join her and her lover Joseph, a bus driver. They go to the seaside and to a restaurant, but the reserved Pharaon finds Joseph ignorant and coarse.

The police investigation moves slowly, with Pharaon looking into possibilities such as whether the murderer was a bus driver or a psychiatric patient. Noting that the murder site could be seen from Eurostar trains, he goes to London to interview passengers. But with no firm lead, the case is taken over by the Lille police.

The factory where Domino works goes on strike and the police, led by Pharaon, have to quell a demonstration. Though outwardly angry, in fact Domino admires his quiet determination and offers herself to him. However, he rejects her explicit advances, saying “not like that”, and his mother warns her off.

Then the Lille police arrest Joseph. When Pharaon gets to the police station, he finds him beaten up and weeping. At first baffled, Pharaon is soon surprised to find Joseph confessing in tears. Being a man of deep feeling, Pharaon comforts him, caressing him with his nose and kissing him on the mouth. When he goes home, his mother is out and Domino is at the kitchen table weeping. He comforts her. The final shot shows Pharaon sitting in a chair in his office at the police station, staring out the window, with handcuffs visibly shackling his wrists.

Cast
 Emmanuel Schotté as Pharaon de Winter
 Séverine Caneele as Domino
 Philippe Tullier as Joseph
 Ghislain Ghesquère as Police Chief
 Ginette Allegre as Eliane de Winter
 Daniel Leroux as Nurse
 Arnaud Brejon de la Lavergnee as Museum Curator
 Daniel Petillon as Jean, the cop
 Robert Bunzi as English cop
 Dominique Pruvost as Angry worker
 Jean-Luc Dumont as Armed cop
 Diane Gray as British traveller
 Paul Gray as British traveller
 Sophie Vercamer as Worker
 Murielle Houche as Worker

Production
Séverine Caneele was replaced by a body double in the scene in which Domino's vulva in seen in close-up.

Awards
The film was entered into the 1999 Cannes Film Festival where it won the following awards:
 Grand Prix
 Best Actor (Emmanuel Schotté)
 Best Actress (Séverine Caneele)

References

External links
 
 
L’humanité: Ordinary Human Behavior an essay by Nicholas Elliott at the Criterion Collection

1999 films
1999 drama films
French drama films
1990s French-language films
Films directed by Bruno Dumont
Cannes Grand Prix winners
1990s French films